The Solling is a range of hills up to  high in the Weser Uplands in the German state of Lower Saxony, whose extreme southerly foothills extend into Hesse and North Rhine-Westphalia.

Inside Lower Saxony it is the second largest range of hills and the third highest after the Harz (Wurmberg; 971 m) and the Kaufungen Forest (Haferberg; 581 m).

The Solling is a cultural landscape consisting mainly of spruce and beech forests. Oak also grows in some areas. The Solling forest is home of a number of animals and birds, for example red deer or chaffinch. They can best be observed in the Neuhaus wildlife park.

Together with the smaller and lower Vogler range and the little Burgberg to the north, the Solling is part of the Solling-Vogler Nature Park.

Hills 
The main hills in the Solling include the following (heights given in m above Normalnull):

 Große Blöße (527.8 m)
 Großer Ahrensberg (524.9 m)
 Moosberg (513.0 m) – with Hochsolling observation tower
 Vogelherd (c. 505 m)
 Dreiberg (493.5 m)
 Großer Steinberg (493 m) – with "Harzblick" observation tower
 Tünnekenbornstrang (490.1 m)
 Langenberg (484.6 m)
 Bärenkopf (473.0 m)
 Wolfsstrang (468.7 m) – with Gaußstein 
 Schönenberg (457.1 m)
 Hasselberg (also called the Schrodhalbe; 452.5 m) – with TV tower
 Hahnenbreite (452.0 m)
 Alte Schmacht (447.5 m) – with transmission facility
 Eisernstieg (446.3 m)
 Strutberg (444 m) – with "Sollingturm" observation tower
 Großer Lauenberg (442.6 m)
 Wildenkiel (c. 441 m)
 Auerhahnkopf (c. 440 m)
 Hengstrücken (424 m)
 Buchholz (421.7 m)
 Sonnenköpfe (414.6 m; western peak)
 Sonnenköpfe (407.0 m; eastern peak)
 Junge Schmacht (388.0 m)
 Platte (379.7 m)
 Sommerberg (364.5 m)
 Kahlberg (224.7 m)

Villages and towns 
Villages and towns in the Solling are:

 Abbecke
 Amelith
 Bad Karlshafen
 Bevern
 Bodenfelde
 Boffzen
 Dassel
 Derental
 Einbeck
 Espol
 Fohlenplacken
 Fredelsloh
 Fürstenberg
 Hardegsen
 Hellental
 Hilwartshausen
 Holzminden
 Höxter
 Kammerborn
 Lauenförde
 Lauenberg
 Lüchtringen
 Mackensen
 Merxhausen
 Mühlenberg
 Neuhaus
 Nienover
 Schießhaus
 Sievershausen
 Silberborn
 Schönhagen
 Schorborn
 Sohlingen
 Uslar
 Vahle
 Wahmbeck

Literature 
Johannes Krabbe: Karte des Sollings von 1603, herausgegeben und eingeleitet von
Hans-Martin Arnoldt, Kirstin Casemir und Uwe Ohanski, Verlag Hahnsche Buchhandlung Hannover 2004.

External links 

 http://www.solling.de
 http://www.hutewald.de
 http://www.hackelberg.de
 Wildpark Neuhaus (with forest museum)

 
Central Uplands
Hill ranges of Lower Saxony
Landforms of Hesse
Landforms of North Rhine-Westphalia
Forests and woodlands of Lower Saxony
Forests and woodlands of North Rhine-Westphalia
Hill ranges of Germany